Antônio Maurício Horta de Melo (born December 2, 1948) is a Brazilian jazz guitarist and vocalist.

In addition to composing and performing his own work, Horta has worked for many years as arranger or sideman for Brazilian artists such as Elis Regina, Milton Nascimento, Maria Bethânia, João Bosco, Airto Moreira, Edu Lobo, Nana Caymmi, Flora Purim, Gal Costa, Sérgio Mendes, Chico Buarque, Flávio Venturini, Joyce, Johnny Alf, Wagner Tiso, Francis Hime, and Beto Guedes.

Music career
Horta grew up in Belo Horizonte, Brazil. When he was fourteen, he met Milton Nascimento, who became a lifelong friend and occasional collaborator. His work on Clube da Esquina (1972) by Nascimento led to opportunities with Antonio Carlos Jobim, João Bosco, Nana Caymmi, Gal Costa, and Elis Regina. His debut solo album was Terras Dos Passaros in 1980, released in the U.S. through Capitol Records in 1990. He moved to the U.S, and in time worked with Pat Metheny, Wayne Shorter, Sergio Mendes, Philip Catherine, Herbie Hancock, Billy Higgins, George Duke, and the Manhattan Transfer.

Awards and honors
 5th best guitarist in the world by the British magazine "Melody Maker" in 1977.
 7th best guitarist in 1978, by the same magazine.
 Honorary Citizen of the City of Austin (USA) in 1983.
 He integrates the anthology Progressions: 100 Years of Jazz (Legacy/Columbia, 2005), as one of the most influential jazz guitarists of the twentieth century.
 In 2012, it was included in the list of the 30 greatest Brazilian icons of the guitar and the guitar of the magazine Rolling Stone Brazil.
 Latin Grammy winner 2020 with the album Belo Horizonte.

Discography

As leader
 Toninho Horta (EMI, 1980)
 Terra Dos Passaros (EMI, 1980)
 Diamond Land (Verve Forecast, 1988)
 Moonstone (Verve Forecast, 1989)
 Once I Loved with Gary Peacock, Billy Higgins (Verve, 1992)
 Durango Kid (Big World Music, 1993)
 Foot on the Road (Verve Forecast, 1994)
 Durango Kid 2 (Big World Music, 1995)
 Serenade (Truspace, 1997)
 No Circo Voador with Flavio Venturini (Dubas Música, 1997)
 From Ton to Tom (Minas, 1998)
 Qualquer Canção with Carlos Fernando (Warner Music Brasil, 1999)
 Quadros Modernos with Juarez Moreira, Chiquito Braga (Minas, 2001)
 Com o Pe no Forro (Minas, 2004)
 Duets with Nicola Stilo (Adventure Music, 2005)
 Cape Horn with Arismar do Espírito Santo (Porto das Canoas, 2007)
 Solo Ao Vivo (Minas, 2007)
 Tonight with Tom Lellis (Adventure Music, 2008)
 Harmonia e Vozes (Minas, 2010)
 Minas-Tokyo (Minas, 2013)
 From Napoli to Belo Horizonte with Antonio Onorato (Sud Music; Minas, 2015) 
 No Horizonte De Napoli with Stefano Silvestri (Minas, 2015)
 Belo Horizonte (Minas, 2019)
 Viva Eu with Barbara Casini (Encore Music, 2020)

As sideman
With Joao Bosco
 Caca A Raposa (RCA Victor, 1976)
 Galos de Briga (RCA Victor, 1976)
 Linha de Passe (RCA Victor, 1979)
 Tiro de Misericordia (RCA Victor, 1977)

With Joyce
 Music Inside (Verve Forecast, 1990)
 Sem Voce (DiscMedi Blau, 1999)
 Bossa Duets (Sony BMG, 2003)
 50 (Biscoito Fino, 2018)

With Milton Nascimento
 Clube da Esquina (Odeon, 1972)
 Milagre Dos Peixes (EMI, 1974)
 Milton (A&M, 1976)
 Geraes (EMI, 1976)
 Clube da Esquina 2 (EMI, 1978)
 Minas (Odeon, 1997)

With others
 Leny Andrade, Registro (CBS, 1979)
 Kenny Barron, Sambao (Verve/Gitanes, 1992)
 Fafa de Belem, Estrela Radiante (Philips, 1979)
 George Benson, Songs and Stories (Concord, 2009)
 Maria Bethania, Ciclo (Philips, 1983)
 Maria Bethania, Dezembros (RCA Victor, 1986)
 Fernando Brant, Vendedor de Sonhos (Biscoito Fino, 2019)
 Chico Buarque, Chico Buarque (Polygram 1993)
 Dorival Caymmi, Eu Nao Tenho Onde Morar (Odeon, 1960)
 Nana Caymmi, Nana Caymmi (CID, 1975)
 Michael Davis, Midnight Crossing (Lipstick, 1994)
 Gal Costa, India (Philips, 1973)
 Gal Costa, Agua Viva (Philips, 1978)
 George Duke, A Brazilian Love Affair (Epic 1980)
 Mark Egan, Beyond Words (Bluemoon, 1991)
 Michael Franks, Dragonfly Summer (Reprise, 1993)
 Gil Goldstein & Romero Lubambo, Infinite Love (Big World Music, 1993)
 Beto Guedes, Beto Guedes, Danilo Caymmi, Novelli, Toninho Horta (Odeon, 1973)
 Beto Guedes, Sol de Primavera (EMI, 1979)
 Maria Joao, Chorinho Feliz (Universal/Verve)
 Edu Lobo, Limite Das Aguas/Mestres da MPB Kardum, (Iris Music, 1977)
 Lo Borges, Lo Borges (Odeon, 1972)
 Jon Lucien, Listen Love (Mercury, 1991)
 Peter Madsen, Snuggling Snakes (Minor Music, 1993)
 The Manhattan Transfer, Brasil (Atlantic, 1987)
 Eugenia Melo e Castro, Eugenia Melo e Castro (PolyGram, 1986)
 Eugenia Melo e Castro, Um Gosto de Sol (Selo, 2011)
 Sergio Mendes, Horizonte Aberto (Som Livre, 1979)
 Sidney Miller, Linguas de Fogo (Sol Re Sol, 2015)
 Airto Moreira, Promises of the Sun (Arista, 1976)
 Juarez Moreira, Bom Dia (Bemol, 1989)
 Paulo Moura, Confusao Urbana, Suburbana e Rural (RCA Victor, 1976)
 Lisa Ono, Essencia Suite! (Supuesto!, 1997)
 Hermeto Pascoal, Viajando Com O Som (Far Out, 2017)
 Flora Purim, Nothing Will Be As It Was...Tomorrow (Warner Bros., 1977)
 Rufus Reid, Hues of a Different Blue (Motema, 2011)
 Nicola Stilo, Vira Vida (Via Venet, 2003)
 Luciana Souza, Duos III (Sunnyside/Universal 2012)
 Taiguara, Imyra, Tayra, Ipy Taiguara (Odeon, 1976)
 Wagner Tiso, Profissao: Musica (Philips,Polygram 1991)
 Flavio Venturini, Nascente (EMI, 1985)
 Arthur Verocai, Saudade Demais (Sonopress, 2002)

Further reading
 Toninho Horta: Harmonia Compartilhada (Publishing: Terra dos Pássaros, 2010)
 Songbook: Toninho Horta 108 Partituras (Publishing: Terra dos Pássaros, 2017)

References

External links 
Official website (Portuguese)
Toninho Horta at Discogs

1948 births
Living people
People from Belo Horizonte
Brazilian jazz guitarists
Brazilian male guitarists
Male jazz musicians
Resonance Records artists
Latin Grammy Award winners